Ezekiel B. Turner (May 24, 1825 – June 2, 1888) was a United States district judge of the United States District Court for the Western District of Texas.

Education and career

Born in Putney, Vermont, Turner read law to enter the bar in 1848. He became a prosecuting attorney of St. Joseph County, Michigan in 1850, and then a justice of the peace for that county. He was in private practice in Austin, Texas from 1854 to 1861, becoming a prosecuting attorney of Brownsville, Texas in 1863. He was the United States Attorney for the Western District of Texas from 1866 to 1867. He was the Attorney General of Texas from 1867 to 1870, and then served as a Texas Judge, first of the 32nd Judicial District of Texas from 1871 to 1876, and then of the 16th Judicial District of Texas beginning in 1876.

Federal judicial service

Turner received a recess appointment from President Rutherford B. Hayes on November 18, 1880, to a seat on the United States District Court for the Western District of Texas vacated by Judge Thomas Howard DuVal. He was nominated to the same position by President Hayes on December 14, 1880. He was confirmed by the United States Senate on December 20, 1880, and received his commission the same day. His service terminated on June 2, 1888, due to his death in Austin.

References

Sources

External links
Ezekiel B. Turner entry at the Texas State Historical Association
 

1825 births
1888 deaths
Judges of the United States District Court for the Western District of Texas
Texas state court judges
United States Attorneys for the Western District of Texas
United States federal judges appointed by Rutherford B. Hayes
19th-century American judges
United States federal judges admitted to the practice of law by reading law